Spessard Lindsey Holland (July 10, 1892 – November 6, 1971) was an American lawyer and politician. He served as the 28th Governor of Florida from 1941 to 1945, and later as a US senator for Florida from 1946 to 1971. He would be the first person born in Florida to serve as Governor and US Senator for the state. While serving as a US Senator he would notably introduce the 24th Amendment.

During his tenure as governor, he was mainly preoccupied with the preparations for World War II and the actual war itself. With the death of United States Senator Charles O. Andrews he would be appointed by Governor Millard F. Caldwell on September 25, 1946 to serve out the rest of his term which was set to expire next January. However, he would be reelected during 1946 and would continue to seek reelection during every opportunity available serving as a Senator until he retired in January 1971.

Early life and education
Holland was born at his family's home on 390 East Church Street in Bartow, Florida on July 10, 1892. He was the son of Benjamin Franklin and Fannie Virginia Spessard. Spessard was one of three children in his family. Benjamin was a veteran of the American Civil War serving under the Confederacy as a member of the Georgia State Line under Company I of the 2nd Regiment. Benjamin's father was the orderly sergeant for his son's unit. Benjamin was born in Carroll County, Georgia in 1846 and was 17 when he joined the Georgia State Line in January 1864. He would participate in the Battle of Kennesaw Mountain where he was wounded. He would move to Bartow in 1882 where he created the first abstract company in Polk County. Holland's father would eventually serve as a member of the school board, a county commissioner and as the county treasurer.

His mother moved to Bartow in 1889 and was originally a teacher at the Summerlin Institute (now Bartow High School) prior to being married. Benjamin and Virginia would get married in September 1890 in Monroe County, West Virginia.

He attended public schools, graduating from the Summerlin Institute in 1909. Holland graduated magna cum laude from Emory College (currently Emory University) in 1912, where he was a member of the Alpha Tau Omega fraternity. Holland would go on to teach high school in Warrenton, Georgia from 1912-14.

In 1916, Holland began attending law school at the University of Florida. There he taught in the "sub-freshman department" (high school) of the university. He also became the first elected student body president and a member of the debating society. During his time at Emory and UF, he participated in track and field, football, basketball, and baseball. On one occasion, he played so well as a pitcher in an exhibition game against the Philadelphia Athletics that Connie Mack (the grandfather of Connie Mack III, who would one day hold the Senate seat Holland once occupied) offered him a contract that Holland ultimately declined.

World War I service
Holland qualified to be a Rhodes Scholar, and was already a junior partner with R.B. Huffaker in the Huffaker & Holland law firm, but his plans were interrupted by World War I. Holland volunteered for service and was commissioned as a second lieutenant in the Coast Artillery Corps, where he was transferred to France and served in the brigade's JAG Corps as an assistant adjutant. At his request, Holland was later transferred to the 24th Aero Squadron, Signal Corps of the Army Air Corps. Here he served with Lt. George E. Goldwaithe as a gunner and aerial observer, gathering information and taking photographs in reconnaissance missions behind enemy lines. At various times he took part in battles at Meuse-Argonne, Champagne, St. Mihiel, and Lunéville, where he downed two enemy planes. On one mission, Holland's plane crash-landed in a crater; on December 11, 1918, Holland was awarded the Distinguished Service Cross. The citation, signed by John J. Pershing, noted:

First Lieutenant Spessard L. Holland, C.A.C. Observer 24th, Aero Squadron, distinguished himself by extra-ordinary heroism in connection with military operations against an armed enemy of the United States at Bois de Banthville, France, on October 15, 1918 and in recognition of his gallant conduct I have awarded him in the name of the President the Distinguished Service Cross."

Upon resigning his commission in July 1919, Holland was promoted to captain. Once back in the U.S., he toured for the Victory Loan Drive. After that he would go to Fort Monroe, staying there until he resigned his commission in the army. After that he resumed his law practice in Bartow.

Early political career
After the war, Holland resumed his law practice in Bartow. However, this was short-lived because Holland accepted an appointment as the Polk County prosecutor later that year. He served two years in the prosecutor's office and then left after being elected to a four-year term as a county judge in 1920. Holland was reelected in 1924, but left after the end of his second term in 1929. Holland returned to private law practice later that year, joining William F. Bevis in the law firm of Holland & Bevis. The firm grew rapidly, eventually becoming a large international law firm that still exists today as Holland & Knight.

In 1932, Holland was elected to the Florida Senate, where he served eight years. During his term, Holland was noted for his strong advocacy for public schools; as a member of the school committee, he drafted and cosponsored the Florida School Code and supported legislation that raised teachers' pay and retirement benefits. Holland also supported worker's compensation, tax cuts, and unemployment insurance. He was strongly opposed to both the sales tax and the poll tax, the latter of which he worked with Senator Ernest R. Graham to repeal in 1937.

Although Holland supported discrimination against African-American voters, he opposed the poll tax because he viewed it as a form of wealth discrimination that made voting difficult for both poor whites and poor African-Americans. Publicly, Holland would cite two reasons for his opposition to the poll tax. The first being that he thought it would allow politicians to "buy" their way into office through political machines. Secondly, he thought that eliminating the poll tax would increase the amount of voter turnout in elections.

Gubernatorial campaign 
Holland announced that he was running to be governor on December 4, 1939. He considered running for US Senator but decided not to. His campaign platform called for: expanding assistance to the elderly through increasing a tax on horse and dog tracks, making highways safer, continuing a ban on poll taxes for state elections, creating the Everglades National Park, giving state financial aid for economic development, regulating salary buyers, repealing the gross receipts tax, and improving working conditions in the state. He would also pitch himself as being hard on crime but for tourism in the state.

During the first Democratic Party primary for governor he would get first place. Advancing to the second primary he would face off against Francis P. Whitehair. Whitehair attacked Holland throughout the second primary and said in a speech that he was a candidate for "'an invisible government' of duPont interests, chain stores, and a fertilizer trust." Holland on the other hand charged that Whitehair was a product of a political machine. Whitehair would accuse him of the same thing. Holland would end up winning the second primary. When the general election would approach, the Republican Party would nominate John F. Walter as their candidate for governor to oppose Holland but ended up dropping out though. Holland did end up winning the general election in the end.

Governorship

Overview 
While serving as governor he would promote the establishment of military bases in his state. He would help put the state public school system in a better financial state. A variety of financial reforms would be done under his tenure as governor.

1941 
Spessard Holland would officially become Governor of Florida on January 7, 1941. While serving as governor, his abilities were limited. Under the 1885 Florida Constitution, the governor could only serve for one four year term and the governorship was described as being weak position. Holland also had to compete with the influence of cabinet members who could be re-elected.

Concerns about World War II would be dominant with his audience when becoming governor saying he wished for peace but said that preparations should be made in the case of war. His preparations began when he decided to review $7 million in State Road Department contracts made during the tenure of the Cone administration. He and his wife attended Franklin Delano Roosevelt's third inauguration and while in Washington D.C. he spoke with federal authorities and the Floridian congressional delegation to try to get more money for defense road construction which he was successful in getting. Florida saw an influx of military activities in it during the mobilization prior to entering World War II.

When Holland became governor he would try to turn around Florida's lynching record. Florida, like the rest of the Southern US, faced pressure to take action on lynching during the 1940s. Holland's first challenge came on May 12, 1941 when a 22-year-old African-American man named A.C. Williams, who was accused of raping a 12-year-old girl and committing a robbery, was abducted from a jail in Marianna and lynched. Afterwards there would be pressure on the local government to act as they feared it would result in the federal government responding and pressure was also seen from the Association of Southern Women for the Prevention of Lynching (ASWPL) who wrote letters to Holland. In response, Holland called for an investigation into the death of Williams and named Maurice Tripp as the special investigator. He did not say when he would take further action and a spokesperson for him said he “would be able to reach a decision on whether any action by him against Quincy law enforcement authorities was justified. The pressure of legislative business on the governor was heavy, and the inquest transcript is long.” to give an impression that he was stalling when in reality he was shifting responsibility of the investigation. Tripp submitted a report to Governor Holland on May 25, 1941 which would be the furthest Holland would go in his action and the case would be given to the US Department of Justice in July 1942, which reviewed it. The identities of those who killed him was never found.

When American involvement in World War II began with the attack on Pearl Harbor, Holland promoted new military bases in Florida and coordinated state defenses with the federal government. Governor Holland ordered the Florida Highway Patrol to be on standby to assist the Federal Bureau of Investigation with putting Japanese and other foreigners into custody.

The impact of World War II was felt at a more personal level in Spessard Holland's life as well. One of his sons, Spessard Holland Jr., served as a Marine in the South Pacific. The family planted a victory garden and set up a chicken coop at the Governor's Mansion. His daughter Mary volunteered as an aircraft spotter, while his daughter Craney his wife Mary sewed squares to be used in quilts sent to US troops. The Mansion was opened to visitation by British soldiers who were training in the area. Mary Holland even corresponded with the mothers of the soldiers.

1942 
When the United States entered World War II, German Admiral Karl Dönitz launched Operation Drumbeat starting in January 1942, in an effort to cause significant damage to American shipping along the Eastern seaboard and the Gulf Coast. U-boat activity on Florida's coasts lasted until April but did have a brief lull period in March. As a result of the U-boat activity, tourism declined in the state, and the idea of building the Cross Florida Barge Canal was revived. Holland was neutral on the canal compared to Senators Charles O. Andrews and Claude Pepper who were strongly in support of it. Holland said the reason behind his neutrality was because of the canal itself being incredibly controversial.

During the 1942 general elections, Holland participated despite not being up for re-election. Holland participated by travelling throughout the state making public appearances in an attempt to generate interest in the election, trying to get a gas tax amendment passed. Holland made a statewide radio address urging people to vote. That year nine amendments were on the ballot, and Holland backed three of them: an amendment that would streamline the process for amending the state constitution, the gas tax amendment and another that would create a state freshwater fish & game commission. All nine amendments passed that year with almost no opposition

1943 
During 1943 there were calls for a special session of the state legislature. State senator Wallace Sturgis, from Ocala, wanted a special session of the legislature to revise a 1943 absentee voting law to allow Floridians who were serving in the military outside of the state to register to vote. Sturgis later got the backing of the president pro-tempore of the Senate, Ernest F. Householder. Those wanting to repeal the cigarette tax also joined in with calling for a special session. Holland reacted to this by attempting to reduce enthusiasm towards a special session. In regards to the absentee voting law, Holland thought that it did a good job when it came to the first primary except in instances of those who became 21 prior to leaving the state. However, he thought it was not practical with a second primary as he thought it was very close in time to the first one along with being able to give and receive ballots as well. In terms of the cigarette tax, he thought that it would be safe to not repeal the cigarette tax in the case that if other taxes were to decrease it could serve as a supplement. Holland also cited potential changes in wartime restrictions. Having a special session would become a significant issue in the 1944 Democratic gubernatorial primaries.

During a Governor's conference sometime during 1943 in Denver, Colorado, Holland promoted new railroad freight prices, helping the Florida economy.

1944 & 1945 
Holland was also an outdoorsman and environmentalist. Holland's negotiation of the purchase of Everglades wetland and marshland in 1944 helped lead to the establishment of the Everglades National Park in 1947.

Holland's term ended on January 2, 1945, when Millard F. Caldwell took office.

U.S. senator

Holland, like many Southern Democrats, was a conservative who was pro-business, supported racial segregation, staunchly opposed the civil rights movement and labor unions, and believed in a limited federal government and states' rights. He opposed Harry Truman's proposals for national health insurance and the Fair Employment Practices Commission, and voted to override Truman's veto of the Taft-Hartley Act. However, he accepted the elements of the New Deal that benefited Florida economically, much like other Southern politicians of his time. Holland's views contrasted with those of Senator Claude Pepper, the senior Senator from Florida during his first four years, who was a more outspoken liberal. Holland had bad relations with Daniel McCarthy who he would describe as being "cold or thorny" while Leroy Collins openly disliked his record in the Senate.

1st term 
On September 25, 1946 Holland assumed the U.S. Senate seat vacated by Charles O. Andrews, who had died a week earlier after being nominated by Governor Caldwell. In November 1946 he defeated Republican J. Harry Schad to win a full six-year term.

As he had in the Florida Senate, Holland supported abolishing the poll tax for federal elections during his time in the U.S. Senate, making an attempt to ban it during every session for a dozen years after arriving in Congress. During the 80th Congress, he introduced H.R. 29, which passed the House of Representatives in a 290-112 vote on July 21, 1947, but was filibustered in the Senate. During the following 81st Congress he would introduce H.R. 3199 which also passed the House on July 26, 1949 in a 273-116 vote but got stuck in the Senate Committee on Rules and Administration. On other issues, Holland remained a segregationist who supported discrimination against Black voters, but maintained his view that the poll tax should be repealed because it was a form of wealth discrimination.

2nd term 
In 1952, he ran again for re-election winning a significantly larger margin of the vote (99.82%) than in the previous race in 1946 (78.65%). He, along with all other senators from the former Confederate states (except Lyndon B. Johnson, Estes Kefauver, and Albert Gore, Sr.), signed the 1956 "Southern Manifesto", which condemned the Supreme Court ruling in Brown v. Board of Education (1954), declaring that segregation of public schools was unconstitutional, and promised to resist its implementation. Holland was in favor of Alaskan and Hawaiian statehood. Holland was the first southerner to support statehood for Hawaii. He also voted for Alaska Statehood Act and the Hawaii Admission Act. Along with Alaska's statehood, he would introduce the two Senators-elect of the Alaska's congressional delegation that were produced as a result of the Alaska-Tennessee Plan to the US Senate: Ernest Gruening and Bill Egan.

3rd term 
Up for re-election in 1958, Holland was challenged by his former colleague Claude Pepper in the Democratic primary. After fending off Pepper's challenge, he easily defeated his Republican opponent, Leland Hyzer, in November to win a third term.

During the 87th Congress, Holland finally succeeded in his long-standing quest to ban the poll tax federally. Holland introduced a constitutional amendment that would prohibit states from conditioning the right to vote in federal elections on payment of a poll tax or other types of tax. The amendment was approved by the required two-thirds majority of both houses of Congress in August 1962, was quickly ratified by the required three-fourths of the states (38), and in January 1964 became the Twenty-fourth Amendment to the United States Constitution. Described as being a Conservative Democrat, he believed in maintaining the filibuster and believed that civil rights were something that was a matter for the states. He would once say in opposition to the Civil Rights Act of 1964, "We'll stand up and fight as long as we can".

On November 22, 1963, in the absence of Vice President Lyndon B. Johnson, Senator Edward Kennedy was presiding over a routine session of the Senate. Senators were debating a bill about federal library services and it was almost time for a lunch break before Richard Reidell came running into the chamber where he bumped into Holland whispering that President Kennedy had been shot and Holland would be the first Senator to be informed of it. Reidell repeated his message to Senator Wayne Morse before telling Senator Kennedy of the news. After hearing this he left and went to the lobby where he called the White House and his brother Robert F. Kennedy before going to his office in the Senate Office Building. Holland would end up replacing Kennedy as the presiding officer in the Senate when he left and  Holland took up the chair of the Senate Majority Leader, Mike Mansfield.

4th term 
He won a fourth term in 1964, this time defeating Republican Claude R. Kirk, Jr. Then, in November 1969, at the age of 77, Holland announced that he would not seek re-election in 1970. He actively campaigned for Democrat Lawton Chiles, who defeated U.S. Representative William C. Cramer in the November 1970 election. Cramer had the endorsement of U.S. President Richard Nixon, and had handily defeated G. Harrold Carswell (whom Nixon had earlier nominated unsuccessfully to the United States Supreme Court) in the Republican primary.

Retirement
Holland left office in January 1971. Holland died of a heart attack at his Bartow home on November 6, 1971 at age 79.

Personal life
Holland married Mary Agnes Groover on February 8, 1919 and they were together until his death. Together they had four children: Spessard Lindsey Holland Jr., Mary Grover Holland, William Benjamin Holland and Ivanhoe Elizabeth Holland.  As of 2016 their youngest daughter, Ivanhoe Craney, is the only one that is still alive and she currently lives in Bartow. Mary Holland would die after having a stroke in March 1975. In 1974, the city of Bartow would dedicate Mary Holland Park in honor of her.

Holland's grandson Spessard Lindsey Holland III died on August 4, 2014.

Holland was also a member of several fraternities during his life: Phi Beta Kappa, Alpha Tau Omega and Phi Delta Phi. His son Spessard Lindsey Holland, Jr. would be a nonregistered member of Phi Delta Phi. He was involved with Freemasonry being a 33rd degree Shriner. Along with freemasonry he would be a member of: Sons of the American Revolution, American Legion, Veterans of Foreign Wars, Bartow's Kiwanis club and the Elks. General James Van Fleet was a personal friend of Holland and did support him running for governor.

He was described as being a conservationist and enjoyed doing birdwatching. Holland also liked hunting and fishing as well. Holland was a fan of baseball and football and played tennis. He enjoyed collecting books on Florida history. While teaching in Georgia, he was known to have owned a motorcycle and crashed it many times; once he was flung 60 feet from it and landed scraping much of the skin from his back.

Honors and degrees
He received several honorary degrees:
Rollins College (Bachelor of Laws, 1941)
Florida Southern College (Bachelor of Laws, 1941)
Florida State University (Bachelor of Laws, 1941)
Emory University (Bachelor of Laws, 1941)
Florida State University (Bachelor of Laws, 1956)
University of Miami (Bachelor of Laws, 1962)
University of Florida (Doctor of Comparative/Civil Law, 1953)
University of Tampa (HHD, 1956)
Stetson University College of Law  (Doctor of Laws, 1970)

Several buildings and public facilities are named after Holland:
The Spessard L. Holland Law Center, the administrative building at the University of Florida Law School;
The Holland Building in Tallahassee;
The Spessard Holland Golf Course, Park, and Community Center, and the Spessard Holland Beaches, North and South, in Melbourne Beach;
The Spessard L. Holland Elementary School in his hometown of Bartow;
The Spessard L. Holland Elementary School in Satellite Beach, "Home of the Holland Hornets";
The Spessard Holland East-West Expressway (State Road 408); and
The section of U.S. Highway 17 in Holland's hometown of Bartow is known as the Spessard Holland Parkway.

References

Finley, Keith M. Delaying the Dream: Southern Senators and the Fight Against Civil Rights, 1938–1965 (Baton Rouge, LSU Press, 2008).

External links

Guide to the Spessard L. Holland Papers at the University of Florida
 

1892 births
1971 deaths
United States Army personnel of World War I
Democratic Party United States senators from Florida
Florida state court judges
Democratic Party Florida state senators
Democratic Party governors of Florida
People from Bartow, Florida
Recipients of the Distinguished Service Cross (United States)
United States Army officers
Fredric G. Levin College of Law alumni
Bartow High School alumni
People from Warrenton, Georgia
20th-century American judges
Military personnel from Florida
Holland & Knight partners
20th-century American politicians